Taner Akyol (born 1977) is a Turkish saz or bağlama player and classical composer.

Biography
Akyol was born in Bursa. He studied in Germany at the Brandenburgischen Colloquium für Neue Musik and the Hochschule für Musik "Hanns Eisler". In 2003 he founded the Taner Akyol Trio with Antonis Anissegos and David Kuckhermann.

Recordings

As composer and performer
 2001, Musica Vitale – one track by Akyol, as prizewinner in 1998
 2003, Traveller – Taner Akyol Trio
 2006, Global Ear, 4 Modern Composers – Ganesh Anandan, Indian percussionist based in Canada.  (born 1971), Kazakhstan. Tanyer Akyol, Turkey,  (born 1951), Germany.
 2007, Tanyer Akyol Birds Of Passage
 2011, Maria Farantouri Sings Taner Akyol. Maria Farantouri sings in Greek translation poems of the persecution suffered by the Kurdish people.
 2012, Ali Baba and the 40 Thieves: children's opera at the Komische Oper Berlin. Libretto by actor  (born 1937).

As performer only
 2002, Peri, project
 2006,  – performer (bağlama) Rot ist mein Name (Westdeutscher Rundfunk Cologne, 2005)

References

External links
 

Turkish classical composers
1977 births
Living people
Bağlama players